Carlo Colombo (born 28 April 1960) is an Italian sports shooter. He competed at the 1992 Summer Olympics and the 1996 Summer Olympics.

References

1960 births
Living people
Italian male sport shooters
Olympic shooters of Italy
Shooters at the 1992 Summer Olympics
Shooters at the 1996 Summer Olympics
Sportspeople from Milan